The 1947 Springfield Gymnasts football team, sometimes also referred to as the Maroons, was an American football team that represented the Springfield College in Springfield, Massachusetts, during the 1947 college football season.  In its second season under head coach Ossie Solem, the team compiled a 4–4 record and played its home games at Pratt Field in Springfield.

Solem had previously coached for three major football programs, Drake (1921–1931), Iowa (1932–1936), and Syracuse (1937–1945). During Solem's tenure as head coach, the program scheduled games against regional powers like Yale and Connecticut and intersectional games against opponents like Wayne.

Schedule

References

Springfield
Springfield Pride football seasons
Springfield Gymnasts football